Orlando Lampa (23 October 1944 – 31 October 2020) was a Filipino sprinter who competed in the 1966 Asian Games.

Career
He is known for coaching several athletes from Rizal, some of whom competed for the Philippines internationally in the early 1970s. This includes 1972 Summer Olympics runner Lucila Salao who set the national record of 14.3 in the 100 meter hurdles, Salao's Olympic teammate Amelita Alanes, as well as Elmer Reyes and Jaime Sabado.

Lampa in the 1980s after a break from athletics also became coach of the Philippine Navy's track and field team which won the 1987 National Open Championship. He had a son, Orlan who once held the national 100 meters junior record.

He died on October 31, 2020 due to cardiac arrest at the Taguig Medical Center.

References

1944 births
2020 deaths
Filipino male sprinters
Athletes (track and field) at the 1966 Asian Games
Asian Games competitors for the Philippines